The tribe Dalbergieae is an early-branching clade within the flowering plant subfamily Faboideae (or Papilionaceae).  Within that subfamily, it belongs to an unranked clade called the dalbergioids. It was recently revised to include many genera formerly placed in tribes Adesmieae and Aeschynomeneae and to be included in a monophyletic group informally known as the dalbergioids sensu lato. The members of this tribe have a distinctive root nodule morphology, often referred to as an "aeschynomenoid" or "dalbergioid" nodule.

Subclades and genera

Adesmia clade

 Adesmia DC.
 Amicia Kunth
 Chaetocalyx DC.
 Nissolia Jacq.
 Poiretia Vent.
 Zornia J. F. Gmel.

Dalbergia clade

 Aeschynomene L.

 Bryaspis P. A. Duvign.

 Cyclocarpa Afzel. ex Urb.
 Dalbergia L. f.
 Diphysa Jacq.

 Geissaspis Wight & Arn.
 Humularia P. A. Duvign.
 Kotschya Endl.
 Machaerium Pers.

 Ormocarpopsis R. Vig.
 Ormocarpum P. Beauv.

 Pictetia DC.
 Smithia Aiton
 Soemmeringia Mart.
 Steinbachiella Harms.

 Weberbauerella Ulbr.
 Zygocarpum Thulin & Lavin

Pterocarpus clade

 Acosmium Schott

 Arachis L.
 Brya P. Browne
 Cascaronia Griseb.
 Centrolobium Mart. ex Benth.
 Chapmannia Torr. & A. Gray
 Cranocarpus Benth.
 Discolobium Benth.

 Etaballia Benth.
 Fiebrigiella Harms
 Fissicalyx Benth.
 Geoffroea Jacq.
 Grazielodendron H. C. Lima
 Inocarpus J. R. Forst. & G. Forst.
 Maraniona C.E.Hughes, G.P.Lewis, Daza, & Reynel
 Paramachaerium Ducke
 Platymiscium Vogel
 Platypodium Vogel
 Pterocarpus Jacq.
 Ramorinoa Speg.
 Riedeliella Harms
 Stylosanthes Sw.
 Tipuana (Benth.) Benth.

References

External links

 
Fabaceae tribes